Dogme language teaching is considered to be both a methodology and a movement.  Dogme is a communicative approach to language teaching that encourages teaching without published textbooks and focuses instead  on conversational communication among learners and teacher.  It has its roots in an article by the language education author, Scott Thornbury.  The Dogme approach is also referred to as "Dogme ELT", which reflects its origins in the ELT (English language teaching) sector.  Although Dogme language teaching gained its name from an analogy with the Dogme 95 film movement (initiated by Lars von Trier) in which the directors, actors, and actresses commit a "vow of chastity" to minimize their reliance on special effects that may create unauthentic feelings from the viewers, the connection is not considered close.

Key principles
Dogme has ten key principles.

Interactivity: the most direct route to learning is to be found in the interactivity between teachers and students and amongst the students themselves.
Engagement: students are most engaged by content they have created themselves.
Dialogic processes: learning is social and dialogic, where knowledge is co-constructed.
Scaffolded conversations: learning takes place through conversations, where the learner and teacher co-construct the knowledge and skills.
Emergence: language and grammar emerge from the learning process.  This is seen as distinct from the 'acquisition' of language.
Affordances: the teacher's role is to optimize language learning affordances through directing attention to emergent language.
Voice: the learner's voice is given recognition along with the learner's beliefs and knowledge.
Empowerment: students and teachers are empowered by freeing the classroom of published materials and textbooks.
Relevance: materials (e.g. texts, audios and videos) should have relevance for the learners.
Critical use: teachers and students should use published materials and textbooks in a critical way that recognizes their cultural and ideological biases.

Main precepts
There are three precepts (later described by Thornbury as the "three pillars" of Dogme ) that emerge from the ten key principles.

Conversation-driven teaching
Conversation is seen as central to language learning within the Dogme framework, because it is the "fundamental and universal form of language" and so is considered to be "language at work". Since real life conversation is more interactional than it is transactional, Dogme places more value on communication that promotes social interaction.  Dogme also places more emphasis on a discourse-level (rather than sentence-level) approach to language, as it is considered to better prepare learners for real-life communication, where the entire conversation is more relevant than the analysis of specific utterances.  Dogme considers that the learning of a skill is co-constructed within the interaction between the learner and the teacher.  In this sense, teaching is a conversation between the two parties.  As such, Dogme is seen to reflect Tharp's view that "to most truly teach, one must converse; to truly converse is to teach".

Revision to the concept of Dogme as being conversation driven 

The immutability of conversation as one of the "pillars" of Dogme was called into question by Scott Thornbury himself in a 2020 interview. When asked what might happen should a student not wish to engage in classroom conversation, Thornbury suggested that saying Dogme had to be "conversation driven" might have been a "mistake": I think one of the mistakes we made was making conversation part of the... "three pillars", and what really should be said, is that Dogme is driven not by conversations, but by texts... texts meaning both written and spoken. Arguably, this suggestion that Dogme language teaching should be seen as being "text-driven", rather than "conversation-driven", caters to more reflective learners.

Materials light approach
The Dogme approach considers that student-produced material is preferable to published materials and textbooks, to the extent of inviting teachers to take a 'vow of chastity' (which Thornbury and Meddings have since pointed out was "tongue-in-cheek") and not use textbooks. Dogme teaching has therefore been criticized as not offering teachers the opportunity to use a complete range of materials and resources. However, there is a debate over the extent to which Dogme is actually anti-textbook or anti-technology. Meddings and Thornbury focus their critique of textbooks on their tendency to focus on grammar more than on communicative competency and also on the cultural biases often found in textbooks, especially those aimed at global markets.  Indeed, Dogme can be seen as a pedagogy that is able to address the lack of availability or affordability of materials in many parts of the world.  Proponents of a Dogme approach argue that they are not so much anti-materials as pro-learner, and thus align themselves with other forms of learner-centered instruction and critical pedagogy.

Emergent language
Dogme considers language learning to be a process where language emerges rather than one where it is acquired.  Dogme shares this belief with other approaches to language education, such as task-based learning.  Language is considered to emerge in two ways.  Firstly classroom activities lead to collaborative communication amongst the students.  Secondly, learners produce language that they were not necessarily taught. The teacher's role, in part, is to facilitate the emergence of language.  However, Dogme does not see the teacher's role as merely to create the right conditions for language to emerge.  The teacher must also encourage learners to engage with this new language to ensure learning takes place.  The teacher can do this in a variety of ways, including rewarding, repeating and reviewing it. As language emerges rather than is acquired, there is no need to follow a syllabus that is externally set.  Indeed, the content of the syllabus is covered (or 'uncovered') throughout the learning process. Ali ketabi (TESOL holder)

Pedagogical foundations

 First, Dogme is based not only on theories of language teaching and learning but also on progressive, critical, and humanist educational theories. Adopting the Dialogic model, Dogme encourages students and teachers to communicate in order to exchange ideas, which is the prerequisite for education to occur. 
 Dogme also has its roots in communicative language teaching (in fact Dogme sees itself as an attempt to restore the communicative aspect to communicative approaches).   Dogme has been noted for its compatibility with reflective teaching and for its intention to "humanize the classroom through a radical pedagogy of dialogue".  It also shares many qualities with task-based language learning and only differs with task-based learning in terms of methodology rather than philosophy.  Research evidence for Dogme is limited but Thornbury argues that the similarities with task-based learning suggest that Dogme likely leads to similar results.  An example is the findings that learners tend to interact, produce language and collaboratively co-construct their learning when engaged in communicative tasks.
 Another significant milestone that contributed to the birth of Dogme was the introduction of Emergentism. Dogme follows the same idea of language emergence through dialogs, which allows learners to enhance the effectiveness of communication. Later on, through the action of language awareness-raising activities and focus-on-form tasks, learners can refine the interlanguage and get more proximate to the target language

As a critical pedagogy
Although Thornbury notes that Dogme is not inherently seeking social change and therefore does not fulfill generally held criteria for a critical pedagogy, Dogme can be seen as critical in terms of its anti-establishment approach to language teaching.

Technology and web 2.0
Although Dogme teaching has been seen to be anti-technology, Thornbury maintains that he does not see Dogme as being opposed to technology as such, rather that the approach is critical of using technology that does not enable teaching that is both learner centered and is based upon authentic communication.  Indeed, more recent attempts to map Dogme principles on to language learning with web 2.0 tools (under the term "Dogme 2.0") are considered evidence of Dogme being in transition    and therefore of being compatible with new technology.  However, although there is not a clear consensus among Dogme teachers on this issue (see discussions on the ELT Dogme Yahoo Group), there is a dominant view that the physical classroom will be preferable to attempts to substitute physical presence with communication via digital technology.  Dogme can combine with different technological tools as our society is constantly changing. Teachers can combine Dogme philosophy with the other methods such  as flipped classrooms or e-learning environments. However, what  matters is that Dogme, as critical pedagogy, is transformative and seeks social changes

Criticism
Dogme has come under criticism from a wide range of teachers and educators for its perceived rejection of both published textbooks and modern technology in language lessons.  Furthermore, it has been suggested that the initial call for a 'vow of chastity' is unnecessarily purist, and that a weaker adoption of Dogme principles would allow teachers the freedom to choose resources according to the needs of a particular lesson. Maley also presents Dogme as an approach that "[increases] the constraints on teachers". Christensen notes that adoption of Dogme practices may face greater cultural challenges in countries outside of Europe, such as Japan.  Questions have also been raised about the appropriateness of Dogme in low resource contexts and where students are preparing for examinations that have specific syllabi.

In  general,  the  criticisms  and  concerns  that  Dogme  encounters  revolve  around  several  major  issues:  the  theoretical  foundation  of  the  conversation-driven  perspective,  the  under-preparedness  of lesson structure, and the potential pressure on teachers and students in various learning contexts. Dogme  can  challenge  inexperienced  teachers  who  have  an  inadequate  pedagogical  repertoire,  and  limited  access to resources. It may also face challenges regarding its applicability in classes of students with low levels of proficiency. Low-level students cannot interact with the teacher and peers effectively in the target language.

Notes

References

Language-teaching methodology